In sociology of science, the graphism thesis is a proposition of Bruno Latour that graphs are important in science.

Research has shown that one can distinguish between hard science and soft science disciplines based on the level of graph use, so it can be argued that there is a correlation between scientificity and visuality. Furthermore, natural sciences publications appear to make heavier use of graphs than mathematical and social sciences.

It has been claimed that an example of a discipline that uses graphs heavily but is not at all scientific is technical analysis.

See also
 Philosophy of science
 Epistemology
 Fields of science
 List of academic disciplines
 Graphism

References

External links

Sociology of science
Bruno Latour